Giuseppe Ferlendis (1755–1810) was an Italian oboist and composer. In 1777, he was appointed oboist at the Court Chapel of Salzburg, with a yearly stipend of 540 florins (higher than that of Mozart by 40 florins). He died in Lisbon. His brother Pietro and his nephews Gerardo, Faustino and Antonio were all professional oboists.

Works
Oboe Concerto No. 1 in F Major (c. 1777)
Oboe Concerto No. 2 in C Major
Oboe Concerto No. 3 in C Major
English Horn Concerto in F Major

References

Sources
 Alfredo Bernardini, "Ferlendis, Giuseppe" in The New Grove Dictionary of Music and Musicians edited by Stanley Sadie, volume 8, page 682

1755 births
1810 deaths
Italian Roman Catholics
Italian composers
Italian male composers
Italian oboists
Male oboists